Cornutella is a genus of acari in the family Labidostommatidae.

References 

 Shiba, M. 1972: Some prostigmatid mites from Mt. Poroshiri in Hokkaido, northern Japan. Memoirs of the National Science Museum Tokyo, 5: 45-55.

External links 
 

Trombidiformes genera